The Eerste Klasse started as the 1st tier of football in the Netherlands and is now the 6th tier. The league is divided into eleven divisions, six for Saturday clubs and five for Sunday clubs. These divisions correspond to the six districts of the Royal Dutch Football Association: each district organises a Saturday competition and a Sunday competition, except for South II, which only has a Sunday competition.

Each division consists of 14 teams. The champion of the Eerste Klasse divisions are promoted to the Vierde Divisie (formerly Hoofdklasse). Furthermore, a season is divided into two periods of eight matches each. The winners of these periods qualify for promotion playoffs, provided they finish in the top nine overall in the season. The numbers 11 and 12 in the final rankings play relegation playoffs, and the numbers 13 and 14 relegated to the Tweede Klasse.

Eerste Klasse divisions

References

  
6
Neth